Throughout all 52 weeks in 2011, 31 songs topped the Mega Single Top 100. The Single Top 100 is a chart composed by MegaCharts based on official physical single sales and legal downloads, and one of the three official Dutch record charts, the two others being the Dutch Top 40 and the Mega Top 50. The first number-one hit on the chart in 2011 was Martin Solveig and Dragonette's "Hello", and the last was Studio Killers' "Ode to the Bouncer".

Artists and acts that had or were featured in at least one song that topped the Mega Single Top 100 that year for at least one week were Martin Solveig, Dragonette, Jan Smit, Ben Saunders, Dean Saunders, Adele, 3JS, Lady GaGa, Nick & Simon, Alexis Jordan, Glennis Grace, Frans Duijts, Do, Coldplay, Rochelle Perts, Guus Meeuwis, Sak Noel, Lucenzo, Big Ali, Don Omar, Nick Schilder, Thomas Acda, Keizer, Paul de Munnik, Gotye, Kimbra, The Voice of Holland, Gers Pardoel, Jeroen van der Boom, Metropole Orkest (Dutch: The Metropole Orchestra), Birdy, Sandro Silva, Quintino and Studio Killers. Out of these acts, 20 of them, Dean Saunders, Alexis Jordan, Glennis Grace, Frans Duijts, Rochelle Perts, Guus Meeuwis, Sak Noel, Don Amor, Big Ali, Lucenzo, Nick Schilder, Thomas Acda, Simon Keizer, Paul de Munnik, Gotye, Kimbra, Birdy, Quintino, Sandro, and Studio Killers, achieved their first number-one single on the chart that year, either as lead or featured artist. Two artists, Jan Simit and Adele, had 2 songs that went number one. 23 singles that topped the chart were solo songs, while eight others were collaborations. One of Adele's songs, "Rolling in the Deep", was the best-performing single of 2011, topping the Single Top 100's 2011 year-end chart.

Chart history
Source:

See also
2011 in music
List of Dutch Top 40 number-one singles of 2011

References

External links
Single Top 100 at the compiler MegaChart's official site - 

Single Top 100
Netherlands Single Top 100
2011 Single Top 100